Stool. may refer to:
 Stool (seat), a type of seat without back support or arm rests
 Bar stool
 Footstool
 Stool, feces
 Human feces, more commonly called "stool"
 Stool test, the collection and analysis of fecal matter to diagnose the presence or absence of a medical condition
 Stool, a living stump of a tree, capable of producing sprouts or cuttings
 Stool (hieroglyph), an alphabetic uniliteral sign of ancient Egypt

See also
 Golden Stool, throne of kings of the Ashanti people
 Groom of the Stool, the most intimate of an English monarch's courtiers
 Informant, sometimes called a "stool pigeon" or "stoolie"